Amadeus IV may refer to:

 Amadeus IV, Count of Savoy (1197–1253)
 Amadeus IV of Geneva (died 1369)